Ayub Kalule (born 6 January 1954) is a retired boxer from Uganda, who first came to prominence when he won the Amateur World Welterweight Title at the inaugural 1974 World Championships in Havana, Cuba. As a professional, he held the WBA and The Ring light middleweight titles from 1979 until 1981.

Boxing career
Born in Kampala, he began his professional boxing career in 1976 when he won a four-round decision over Kurt Hombach in Copenhagen, Denmark. Kalule would be based out of Denmark for the rest of his career. He then won 29 more victories, achieving 30 wins, 0 losses. Included in those victories were defeats of Alipata Korovou for the Commonwealth Middleweight Title and a 10-round decision of former US Gold Medalist Sugar Ray Seales.

On 24 October 1979, Kalule was in Akita, Japan to take on Masashi Kudo for the Lineal and WBA Junior middleweight titles. Kalule easily outboxed the champion and thus captured the coveted world championship crown. He then successfully defended the title four times before taking on the legendary Sugar Ray Leonard on 25 June 1981 in the Houston Astrodome. A virtual unknown in the United States, Kalule was considered little more than a courier waiting to deliver the belt to Leonard. The fight proved much more difficult for Leonard as Kalule repeatedly landed straight lefts and fought on an almost even ground for the first five or six rounds. Slowly Leonard started to take control and in the 9th round ended the fight and Kalule's reign as WBA Champion.

Kalule fought on until the beginning of 1986 and managed to win the European Middleweight Title and defend it successfully against future world champion Sumbu Kalambay. Prior to that, he received another shot at the WBA Jr Middleweight Title held at that time by Davey Moore. Kalule put up a very good fight, but again was KO'd, this time in the 10th round. Ayub's career ended on 5 February 1986 when he lost the European Middleweight Title to Herol Graham. He finished his career with a very impressive record of 46–4 with 23 KOs.

Professional boxing record

See also
List of world light-middleweight boxing champions

References

External links

Boxing-Records
Ayub Kalule - CBZ Profile

 

|-

1954 births
Living people
Ugandan male boxers
Sportspeople from Kampala
Ugandan emigrants to Denmark
Southpaw boxers
Commonwealth Games gold medallists for Uganda
Boxers at the 1974 British Commonwealth Games
Commonwealth Games medallists in boxing
AIBA World Boxing Championships medalists
Commonwealth Boxing Council champions
European Boxing Union champions
Middleweight boxers
World light-middleweight boxing champions
World Boxing Association champions
The Ring (magazine) champions
Medallists at the 1974 British Commonwealth Games